is a canyon near Kurobe, Toyama Prefecture, Japan.

The Kurobe Dam in Kurobe Gorge is one of highlights of the Tateyama Kurobe Alpine Route. The area was designated the Chūbu-Sangaku National Park on December 4, 1934.

Geography

Shimonoroka 
Shimonoroka, or lower corridor, is the central Kurobe Gorge.

Shimonoroka can be accessed by using the Nichiden hodo (Nichiden Trail) or Suihei hodo (Horizontal Trail). These trails are very dangerous; they can be only 20–50 cm wide and lie 500 m above the riverbed. In October 2019, five people died on the trails.

Kaminoroka 
Kaminoroka means Higher corridor.

Access 
The gorge can be accessed by the Kurobe Gorge Railway.

Attractions 
Kurobe Dam
Kurobe Gorge Railway
Unazuki Onsen
Tateyama Kurobe Alpine Route

See also 
Mount Tate

References

External links 
 https://tatekuro.jp/en/about/area.html

Canyons and gorges of Japan
Chūbu-Sangaku National Park